Blaz4me is the second album by Natas, released on January 8, 1994. Allrovi reviewer Jason Birchmeier wrote "like the Bomb Squad's collage-like approach on It Takes a Nation to Hold Us Back and Dr. Dre's neo-P-Funk sound on The Chronic, Esham crafts a particular aesthetic by endlessly raiding his record collection in classic postmodern fashion. Still, even if he unethically creates an innovative-for-its-time sound that merges Funkadelic guitar distortion with hard mid-'80s Def Jam-like beats, the often ridiculous lyrics ruin whatever validity the music may have."

Track listing

References 

1994 albums
Albums produced by Esham
Natas (group) albums
Reel Life Productions albums